Westfall Local School District is a school district in Pickaway County, Ohio.

Westfall High School is the district's only high school.

References

External links
 

Education in Pickaway County, Ohio
School districts in Ohio